Bartolomé "Tomeu" Salvá Vidal (born 20 November 1986 in Cala Millor, Mallorca, Balearic Islands) is a Spanish tennis coach and former player.

At the 2007 Torneo Godó, held in Barcelona, Spain, Salvá and Rafael Nadal made it to the final, defeating Jonathan Erlich and Andy Ram (both ranked 13) and Mark Knowles and Daniel Nestor (both ranked fifth) in straight sets on both occasions. In the last round Alexander Waske and Andrei Pavel defeated them 6–3, 7–6(1).

ATP Tour finals

Doubles: 2 (2 runner-ups)

ATP Challenger Tour finals

Doubles: 1 (1 runner-up)

References

External links
 
 

1986 births
Living people
Tennis players from the Balearic Islands
Spanish male tennis players
Sportspeople from Mallorca
People from Son Servera